Sir Siddiq Abubakar III,  (15 March 1903 – 1 November 1988) was a Nigerian Muslim leader (Sarkin Musulmi). He served as the 17th Sultan of Sokoto between 17 June 1938 and 1 November 1988, making him the longest-reigning Sultan.

Life and career 

Siddiq Abubakar III was born in Dange on 15 March 1903.

Dan Mu’azu, a son of Usman Shehu, was a grandson of Mu'azu and, through him, a direct descendant of Usman Dan Fodio. Abubakar was the fourth-generation heir to a two-century-old throne founded by his ancestor, Sheikh Usman Dan Fodio (1754–1817) leader of the Maliki school of Islam and the Qadiri branch of Sunni.

Abubakar had an Islamic education. and served as a district scribe in Dange between 1929 and 1931. In February 1931 Abubakar succeeded his uncle, Hassan Ibn Muazu, as the local authority councillor (Head of Talata Mafara) of the Sokoto Native Authority. He rapidly distinguished himself through administrative competence, skilled management of appeals from traditional courts, and his effective supervision of district and village heads, and as a result served until 1938. As councillor he worked from Sokoto, taking part in the decision-making process of the Sokoto Native Authority and supervising the prisons and police departments. His profile rose in Sokoto as his position made him accessible to the people, but it also led to tensions with Sultan Hasan dan Mu’azu Ahmadu. When Abubakar contested the throne with other princes, such as Ahmadu Rabbah and Ahmadu Isa of Gobir, the favourable impressions that Sokoto residents had towards him contributed to making his ascension possible. The British were also interested in appointing a leader who had the trust of the people within the political structure of Indirect rule, so they suggested the name of Abubakar to the kingmakers. On 17 June 1938, he was crowned as the 17th Sultan (Sarkin Musulmi) of the Sokoto Caliphate.

Abubakar was appointed a Knight Commander of the Order of the British Empire (GBE) by King George VI during the Colonial Nigerian period in 1944, and after Nigeria attained independence in 1960, made a Grand Commander of the Order of the Niger (GCON) by the Federal Republic of Nigeria in 1964.

Sir Abubakar was appointed to the post of Minister Without Portfolio for the Northern Regional Government in 1951, providing moral support for the new administration of regional premier Sir Ahmadu Bello and assistance with mobilizing the Northern people for the independence movement. He then continued to play a significant role reducing tensions in the region after the coup and assassination of Premier Sir Ahmadu Bello, Sardauna of Sokoto, on 15 January 1966.

On 18 July 1974, President Moktar Ould Daddah, who was on a state visit to Nigeria, paid a visit to Sultan Sir Abubakar, a fellow Islamic scholar, and friend in the company of General Yakubu Gowon.

In 1984, when another Sokoto son, Shehu Shagari, was removed from power, Abubakar preached peace within the emirate council and in its relationship with the new administration. His court focused on the welfare and problems of his community, carrying on a cultural tradition espoused by Usman Dan Fodio.

Legacy 

He left behind 52 children, including Ibrahim Muhammadu Maccido dan Abubakar, who succeeded Sultan Ibrahim Dasuki in 1996 to become the 19th Sultan of Sokoto and died on 29 October 2006, as the eldest, and Isah Saddiq Abubakar III as the youngest with more than 320 direct grandchildren.

Sultan Abubakar III is best remembered by his compatriots as a religious leader who rose above the religious dissensions of his day. Throughout his life, he played the role of peace-maker and father of all.

References

Sultans of Sokoto
Grand Commanders of the Order of the Niger
1903 births
1988 deaths
Nigerian recipients of British titles
Nigerian knights
Nigerian Knights Commander of the Order of the British Empire
Nigerian Muslims
Nigerian Sufi religious leaders
20th-century Nigerian people
People of the Nigerian Civil War
Nigerian Sufis